Flight 604 may refer to:

Allegheny Airlines Flight 604, crashed in 1965
Ethiopian Airlines Flight 604, a flight involved in an aviation incident in 1988
Flash Airlines Flight 604, a flight involved in an aviation accident in 2004
Sonicblue Airways Flight 604, crashed in 2006

0604